Laura Anthony may refer to:

 Laura Anthony (author), pseudonym of Lori Wilde, American author of contemporary romance novels
 Laura Anthony (reporter), general assignment reporter at KGO-TV, San Francisco, California